Walling is a method of torture.

Walling may also refer to:

People
 Cheves Walling (1916-2007), American organic chemist
 Dayne Walling (born 1974), American politician
 Dean Walling (born 1969), English-born Kittian professional footballer 
 Denny Walling (born 1954), American Major League Baseball player
 Edna Walling (1896–1973), Australian landscape designers
 Esther K. Walling (1940–2017), American politician
 Mary Cole Walling (1838–1925), American patriot, lecturer
 Mike Walling (1950–2020), English comic actor and screenwriter
 Rob Walling, serial entrepreneur, author, podcaster, angel investor
 Robert Walling (1895–1976), Cornish soldier, journalist, and poet
 Robert Alfred John Walling (1869–1949), English journalist and author 
 Sydney Walling (1907–2009), Antiguan cricketer 
 William Walling (disambiguation)

Other
 Walling Pond, located in Salem, Oregon, US
 Walling v. Helmerich & Payne, Inc., US labor law case

See also
 Waling, Nepalese municipality